The 1972–73 South-West Indian Ocean cyclone season was an above-average cyclone season. The season officially ran from November 1, 1972, to April 30, 1973.

Systems

Severe Tropical Storm Ariane 

Ariana passed north of Mauritius and later executed a loop southeast of the island.

Severe Tropical Storm Ivy–Beatrice

Moderate Tropical Storm Charlotte 

Charlotte passed just southwest of Réunion on January 8, producing  wind gusts, as well as heavy rainfall reaching  at Riviere de L'Est. The rains damaged crops and flooded roads, which killed one person due to drowning.

Moderate Tropical Storm Dorothee 

Dorothee produced a series of thunderstorms on Réunion while the storm passed to the southwest.

Tropical Disturbance Emmanuelle

Tropical Depression Faustine

Intense Tropical Cyclone Leila–Gertrude 

Severe Tropical Storm Hortense 

On February 2, Hortense passed south of Réunion, bringing rainfall to the island.

Tropical Cyclone Jessy 

On February 21, Jessy struck Rodrigues, bringing heavy rainfall and  wind gusts, causing power outages.

Severe Tropical Storm Isis

Severe Tropical Storm Kitty 

On March 1, Kitty struck Rodrigues, causing power outages.

Very Intense Tropical Cyclone Lydie 

This is the first "Very intense tropical cyclone" in the South-West Indian Ocean.

For four days, the storm dropped heavy rainfall on the island, reaching . Flooding killed 10 people on the island, and caused crop damage.

Tropical Cyclone Roma

Cyclone Roma existed from April 18 to April 23.

Tropical Cyclone Marcelle

See also 

 Atlantic hurricane seasons: 1972, 1973
 Eastern Pacific hurricane seasons: 1972, 1973
 Western Pacific typhoon seasons: 1972, 1973
 North Indian Ocean cyclone seasons: 1972, 1973

References 

South-West Indian Ocean cyclone seasons
1972–73 Southern Hemisphere tropical cyclone season